Bara Sara is a rural commune in the Cercle of Bandigara in the Mopti Region of Mali, near the border of Burkina Faso. The commune contains 23 villages and in the 2009 census had a population of 15,408. The main village is Ouo Sarre.

References

External links
.

Communes of Mopti Region